The genus Neomys is a group of four Eurasian water shrews from the subfamily Soricinae of the family Soricidae. These shrews are found in most of Europe and parts of northern Asia, as well as Turkey and Iran. Its member species are:

Eurasian water shrew (Neomys fodiens) — (Pennant, 1771)
Iberian water shrew (Neomys anomalus) — Cabrera, 1907
Mediterranean water shrew (Neomys milleri) — Mottaz, 1907
Transcaucasian water shrew (Neomys teres) — Miller, 1908

References
 

 
Mammal genera
Mammals of Asia
Mammals of Europe
Taxa named by Johann Jakob Kaup
Extant Pliocene first appearances